Kingston Township is one of nineteen townships in DeKalb County, Illinois, USA.  As of the 2010 census, its population was 3,519 and it contained 1,275 housing units.

Geography

Cities, towns, villages
 Genoa (partial)
 Kingston
 Kirkland (partial)

Unincorporated towns
 Colvin Park at

Cemeteries

 Kingston
 Lanan
 North Kingston
 Vanderburgh

Demographics

School districts
 Belvidere Community Unit School District 100
 Genoa-Kingston Community Unit School District 424
 Hiawatha Community Unit School District 426

Political districts
 Illinois's 16th congressional district
 State House District 69
 State Senate District 35

References
 
 US Census Bureau 2009 TIGER/Line Shapefiles
 US National Atlas

External links
 City-Data.com
 Illinois State Archives
 Township Officials of Illinois
 DeKalb County Official Site

Townships in DeKalb County, Illinois
1849 establishments in Illinois
Townships in Illinois